This is a list of earthquakes in Argentina.
 Details are approximate for old events.
 Magnitude is measured in the Richter magnitude scale.
 Intensity is measured in the Mercalli intensity scale.
 Depth is given in miles.

1600-1899

20th century

21st century

See also

List of earthquakes in Mendoza Province

References
  Instituto Nacional de Prevención Sísmica. Listado de Terremotos Históricos.

 
Earthquakes
Argentina
Earthquakes